Salehabad (also Romanized as Şāleḩābād) is a village in Iran, located in Dehmolla Rural District, in the Central District of Shahrud County, Semnan Province. At the 2006 census, its population was 103, in 30 families.

References 

Populated places in Shahrud County